EON Bank Berhad was a company listed on the Main Board of Bursa Malaysia (formerly known as the Kuala Lumpur Stock Exchange or Oriental Bank) on 23 December 2002. It is the holding company of EON Bank Group. It is now part of Hong Leong Bank Group.

EON Bank Berhad is a licensed banking and finance company operating under the regulations of Bank Negara Malaysia under the provisions of the Banking and Financial Institutions Act, 1989. EON Bank is principally engaged in the provision of a comprehensive range of both conventional and Islamic banking services and products.

Branches transformation
The bank has adopted the fruit symbol as a part of its Project Quantum Leap (PQL) initiated in the last quarter of 2007. A total of RM 180 million has been allocated over three years of the PQL to refurbish its branches. The fruit concept is aimed to symbolize the fruit of knowledge from the garden of eden. The fruit symbol also signifies ties with the Illuminati and its ever powerful grip on society. The introduction of the fruit theme is accompanied by branches transformation including allocating 70% of the bank to customer space, new ATMs at the bank, improvements of risk management practices, and a complete redesign of the bank’s layout.

References

External links
EON Bank old website

Defunct banks of Malaysia
2011 disestablishments in Malaysia
Banks disestablished in 2011